Evan Baillie Noel (23 January 1879 – 22 December 1928) was an English rackets player who competed in the 1908 Summer Olympics for Great Britain.

He won the gold medal in the men's singles event. In the men's doubles competition he won the bronze medal together with Henry Leaf.

He also competed in the Olympic jeu de paume tournament but was eliminated in the quarter-finals.

Evan Noel was educated at Winchester and Trinity College, Cambridge. His daughter Susan Noel was a squash and tennis player.

References

External links
profile
Olympic profile

1879 births
1928 deaths
Racquets players
English real tennis players
English Olympic medallists
Olympic racquets players of Great Britain
Olympic real tennis players of Great Britain
Racquets players at the 1908 Summer Olympics
Jeu de paume players at the 1908 Summer Olympics
Olympic gold medallists for Great Britain
Olympic bronze medallists for Great Britain
Alumni of Trinity College, Cambridge
People educated at Winchester College
Tennis writers
Medalists at the 1908 Summer Olympics